Benjamin Franklin Biaggini (April 15, 1916 – May 28, 2005) was president of the Southern Pacific Company, parent company of Southern Pacific Railroad, from 1964 to 1976 and chairman of the Board of Directors from 1976 to 1983.

References 

1916 births
2005 deaths
20th-century American railroad executives
Southern Pacific Railroad people
St. Mary's University, Texas alumni